Mission Direct is a Christian charity based in the United Kingdom that enables volunteers to travel and work alongside some of the world’s poorest to build homes, schools, clinics, etc., working in over 12 countries.

History 
Nigel Hyde founded Mission Direct with a clear vision: to enable thousands of people to serve the poor on two-week trips.  With three friends, Lawrence Jones, Tim Martindale, and Ronnie Fleming, they found that people wanted to go overseas and help the world’s poorest.  Now, thousands of self-funding volunteers have built schools, clinics, and homes, among countless other small and personal projects.

In 1997 Nigel Hyde was "standing outside an ancient church on Mokattam Mountain in Egypt, my eyes were transfixed by an old lady rummaging through manure. She wanted something to eat or sell...anything to help her survive. I sensed God calling me to dedicate my life to people like her, trapped by the curse of terrible material poverty. Looking back, this was the catalyst that led to the start of Mission Direct…”

Mission Direct's patrons are The Lord Bill Mckenzie of Luton and Rt. Rev Dr. Alan Smith, Bishop of St Albans.

Mission Direct was registered as a charity on the 26th of January, 2005.

Work 
Mission Direct first sent teams overseas in 2005 when they built a home for ladies with polio in Sierra Leone.  In that first year, they also built homes in the Dominican Republic and a school in the tsunami-hit north of Sri Lanka.

Mission Direct looks for local partners who are already doing something well.  They do not own or operate things in the country, enabling them to support sustainable projects. Their overseas staff covers their own costs and hosts relays of teams to the same communities year after year.

In 2014, they sent teams to Brazil, Cambodia, China, the Dominican Republic, Guyana, India, Kenya, Moldova, Sierra Leone, Uganda (Kumi and Rukungiri) Zambia and Zimbabwe.

In 2017 teams have supported projects in Brazil, Dominican Republic, Cambodia, India, Kenya, Malawi, Moldova, Sierra Leone, Uganda, Zambia & Zimbabwe, as well as a UK-based project partnering with Phoenix Community Care Trust – an organization that provides safe housing for children and young asylum seekers arriving in London. Most teams are open to all with the age range so far from 7-89.  They offer school, medical, teacher training, youth, and IT in Schools and corporate teams. Recent work has included building Vision of Hope in Lusaka,  Zambia , providing a safe home for street girls.  The support of corporate teams in the Dominican Republic has enabled Mission Direct to support the ongoing work of local volunteers within their own community. They also run teams for youth from difficult backgrounds.

Literature 
The charity produces literature about their trips, fundraising for volunteers and legacy giving.

References

Further reading
 

Charities based in England
Christian charities based in the United Kingdom
Hitchin
Organisations based in Hertfordshire
Religion in Hertfordshire